The Edinburgh Edition of the Waverley Novels by Walter Scott appeared in thirty volumes between 1993 and 2012. Published by Edinburgh University Press, it was the first complete critical edition of the novels.

History
On 22 June 1983 Archie Turnbull, the Secretary of Edinburgh University Press, announced that his Press Committee had authorised him to investigate the feasibility of undertaking a critical edition of the novels and related fiction of Walter Scott and to welcome expressions of interest.

On 17 February 1984 a group of scholars and other interested parties met at a conference organised by David Daiches, making the decision that (in principle) the new edition should be based on early editions rather than the revised texts in the final 'Magnum' edition of 1829–33, and that David Hewitt of the University of Aberdeen should be Editor-in-Chief. After three years' detailed research the early-text policy was confirmed at a further conference in January 1987, with David Nordloh of the University of Indiana again acting as special advisor.

The novels were published in batches between 1993 and 2009, with the final two volumes of Introductions and Notes from the Magnum Edition appearing in 2012.

Editorial policy
Almost all earlier editions of the Waverley Novels had been based on the 'Magnum' text prepared by Scott at the end of his life, the only significant exception being Claire Lamont's 1981 edition of Waverley, which took the first edition text as its basis. The Edinburgh Edition followed Lamont in basing their texts on the first editions, citing a wish that readers should experience the novels more as they first appeared, and their recognition that many errors were introduced between first publication and the 'Magnum'. Until Scott's acknowledgment of his authorship of the Waverley Novels in 1827 his manuscripts were copied and the copy sent to the printer, to preserve his anonymity. He relied on intermediaries to convert his rudimentary punctuation into a form suitable for public consumption, but in the process mistakes were made: words were misread, passages were omitted, and the punctuation was sometimes misinterpreted. The Edinburgh Edition therefore emended the first-edition copy text extensively, mainly from the manuscripts, and from author's proofs where they survive. Emendations were not introduced from later editions up to the 'Magnum' except to correct clear persisting errors.

References

Novels by Walter Scott